The  is a branch line operated by the Japanese private railway operator Odakyū Electric Railway in eastern Kanagawa Prefecture. The Enoshima Line branches from the Odawara Line at Sagami-Ōno, extending south to Fujisawa and Katase-Enoshima, a distance of 27.6 km. It was completed with 13 stations on April 1, 1929.

As is also the case with the Odawara Line, as well as being a heavy commuter line the operator also offers, for an additional charge, limited express services to the popular scenic site of Enoshima. After the introduction of East Japan Railway Company's (JR East) Shōnan-Shinjuku Line, passengers between Fujisawa Station and Shinjuku Station have had an alternative to the Enoshima Line. Odakyū have responded since then to improve the frequencies of rapid through services to Shinjuku.

History
The Odawara Express Railway Co. opened the Sagami-Ōno - Fujisawa section in 1928, and extended the line to Katase-Enoshima, as well as duplicating the entire line, the following year. In 1943 the line was returned to single track and the steel rail recycled for the Japanese war effort. The line was re-duplicated in 1948/49.

In 1942, the company was forcibly merged by the government with Tokyu Corporation. Tokyu was broken up in 1948 and the line was transferred to the newly founded Odakyu Electric Railway Co.

Freight services operated on the line between 1944 and 1966.

Services
The Limited Express trains are named Enoshima and Homeway. Surcharges are required for rapid and seat reservation services with better accommodation of carriages. Rapid service is also offered. Express and Rapid Express services make more stops than Limited Express services, and are served by the same types of EMUs as Local trains without extra charge.

 
Shinjuku and Katase-Enoshima

Shinjuku and Fujisawa (only two are to/from Katase-Enoshima)

Shinjuku and Katase-Enoshima (some exceptions)

Machida or Sagami-Ōno (some from Shinjuku) and Katase-Enoshima

Stations
For Limited Express service, see Odakyu Electric Railway.

All stations are located in Kanagawa Prefecture.
Legend
 ● : All trains stop
 │ : All trains pass

References
This article incorporates material from the corresponding article in the Japanese Wikipedia.

External links
 Odakyū website
 Pictures and descriptions of stations

 
Enoshima Line
Railway lines in Kanagawa Prefecture
Railway lines opened in 1929
1067 mm gauge railways in Japan